Stree Janma is a 1967 Telugu-language drama film, produced by D. Ramanaidu under the Suresh Productions banner and directed by K. S. Prakash Rao. It stars N. T. Rama Rao and Krishna Kumari, with music composed by Ghantasala.

Plot
A. R. College's founder, Susheela Devi, has two younger brothers, Shekar and Kishore. Besides, Kalyani, a star pupil in the college, attains the endearment of Susheela. Kalyani is the daughter of a bourgeois Parandhamaiah and her elder brother Anand is personnel to Shekar. Meanwhile, Kalyani moves for close friend's wedding when the wheel of fortune makes Shekar land therein. Here, Shekar is infatuated to a dancer Nalini and in the drunken state, he molests Kalyani. Afterward, Shekar repents and admits guilt to Nalini when she realizes his pandemonium and accepts the apology. Just after a doleful, Kalyani becomes pregnant that leads to Parandhamaiah's death. Before dying, Anand assures him to redress Kalyani's life. Time passes, Kalyani delivers a baby boy when Anand deserts him and he is safeguarded by Susheela. After some time, learning Kalyani as Anand's sister Susheela decides to knit her with Shekar. Thereupon, Anand forcibly performs the espousal. Soon after, Kalyani recognizes the baby and affirms the actuality to Susheela. Nevertheless, she exonerates and entreats her to coalesce with Shekar. However, dispirited Kalyani deprecates Shekar which forces him antsy. Parallelly, Kishore falls for Vijaya, daughter of the principle Parabrahmam. Being cognizant of it, lecturer Madhu Murthy an intimate of Shekar, forewarns him. Just as, irate Parabrahmam imputes an illicit relation to Madhu Murthy and Susheela Devi and even poison pens Shekar. Believing it, Shekar proclaims his sister as a slut which makes her attempt suicide. During that plight, Kalyani confesses the reality when infuriated Shekar initiates to knock out her when Nalini arrives and divulges the factuality. Finally, the movie ends, Susheela breathing her last uniting Shekar and Kalyani.

Cast

Soundtrack

Music composed by Ghantasala.

References

External links
 

Indian drama films
Films directed by K. S. Prakash Rao
Films scored by Ghantasala (musician)
1960s Telugu-language films
1967 drama films
1967 films
Suresh Productions films